Norway sent 16 athletes to the 1978 European Athletics Championships which took place 29 August–3 September 1978 in Prague. Norway won one medal at the Championships.

Medalists

References 

Nations at the 1978 European Athletics Championships
Norway at the European Athletics Championships
1978 in Norway